Huili (Yi:  or  nyi ddix xiep or hop li xiep) is a  county-level city of far southern Sichuan province, China. It is under the administration of the Liangshan Yi Autonomous Prefecture.

The county-level city was severely affected by the 2008 Panzhihua earthquake.

Geography and climate 
Huili is situated in southern Sichuan and is the southernmost division of the Liangshan Prefecture, bordering Sichuan's Panzhihua City and Yunnan.

Due to its southerly location in Sichuan and high elevation, Huili has a subtropical highland climate (Köppen Cwb), with mild, very sunny and dry winters, and very warm, rainy summers. Over 60% of the  annual precipitation occurs from June to August. With monthly percent possible sunshine ranging from 34% in July to 72% in February, the county-level city seat receives 2,348 hours of bright sunshine annually.

References

External links

Liangshan Yi Autonomous Prefecture
Amdo
County-level cities in Sichuan